The 2008 Woking Council election took place on 1 May 2008 to elect members of Woking Borough Council in Surrey, England. One third of the council was up for election and the Conservative Party stayed in overall control of the council.

After the election, the composition of the council was:
Conservative 19
Liberal Democrat 17

Background
13 seats were contested in the election with 42 candidates from the Conservatives, Liberal Democrats, Labour and United Kingdom Independence Party (UKIP). Labour only put forward 6 candidates, while UKIP had candidates in every ward for the first time. Since the 2007 election the Conservatives had held a majority on the council after a long period with no party holding a majority.

Election result
The results saw the Conservatives maintain their majority on the council with 19 seats compared to 17 for the Liberal Democrats. Seven new councillors were elected after five sitting councillors stood down and 2 Liberal Democrats lost in the election. The Conservatives gained seats from the Liberal Democrats in Brookwood and Horsell West, while the Liberal Democrats won seats back in Knaphill and Maybury and Sheerwater. Overall turnout in the election at 43.46%, was almost the same as the 43.6% seen in 2007.

Ward results

References

2008
2008 English local elections
2000s in Surrey